Hồng Kỳ may refer to several places in Vietnam, including:

Hồng Kỳ, Hanoi, a commune of Sóc Sơn District
Hồng Kỳ, Bắc Giang, a commune of Yên Thế District